An Lão is a rural district (huyện) of Hai Phong, the third largest city in Vietnam.

As of 2003 the district had a population of 124,592. The district capital lies at An Lão.

References

Districts of Haiphong